Simran is a Punjabi word derived from Sanskrit, स्मरण (smaraṇa, "the act of remembrance , remembrance, reminiscence, recollection"). As a female first name, it may also refer to:

Simran may also refer to:

People
Simran (actress) (born 1976), Indian actress
Simran Jeet Singh, educator, writer, and activist
Simran Judge, Indian American actor
Simran Kaur Mundi (born 1988), Indian model
Simran Kaur, Indian television actress
Simran Natekar (born 1997), Indian actress
Simran Pareenja (born 1996), Indian television actress
 Simran Singh, cricketer

Other uses

Simran (film), 2017 Bollywood film

See also

Indian feminine given names